Ann Loreille Saunders  (23 May 1930 – 13 February 2019) was a British historian and editor for the London Topographical Society and Costume, the journal of The Costume Society.

Selected publications

Authored
Regent’s Park: a study of the development of the area from 1066 to the present day, 1969, 2nd edn 1981
 St. Paul's: The Story of a Cathedral, 2001.

Edited
 Arthur Mee’s London North of the Thames, 1972
 Arthur Mee’s London: the City and Westminster, 1975
 The London County Council Bomb Damage Maps, 2005

References 

1930s births
2019 deaths
Historians of London
Year of birth uncertain
Members of the Order of the British Empire
Fellows of the Society of Antiquaries of London
Women historians
Alumni of the University of London
Alumni of the University of Leicester